Charles-Auguste van den Berghe (1798–1853), was a French painter.	
		
He was born in Beauvais as the son of Augustin van den Berghe and became the pupil of Anne-Louis Girodet de Roussy-Trioson.	

He died in Paris.

References	
	

Charles-Auguste Van den Berghe on Artnet	
	
	

1798 births
1853 deaths
19th-century French painters
French male painters
Mythological painters
École des Beaux-Arts alumni
People from Beauvais
Chevaliers of the Légion d'honneur
Prix de Rome for painting
19th-century French male artists